In mathematics, a Schur-convex function, also known as S-convex, isotonic function and order-preserving function is a function  that for all  such that  is majorized by , one has that . Named after Issai Schur, Schur-convex functions are used in the study of majorization. Every function that is convex and symmetric is also Schur-convex.  The opposite implication is not  true, but all Schur-convex functions are symmetric (under permutations of the arguments).

Schur-concave function 
A function f is 'Schur-concave' if its negative, -f, is Schur-convex.

Schur-Ostrowski criterion

If f is symmetric and all first partial derivatives exist, then 
f is Schur-convex if and only if

 for all 

holds for all 1≤i≠j≤d.

Examples 
  is Schur-concave while  is Schur-convex. This can be seen directly from the definition.
 The Shannon entropy function  is Schur-concave.
 The Rényi entropy function is also Schur-concave.
  is Schur-convex.
 The function  is Schur-concave, when we assume all . In the same way, all the Elementary symmetric functions are Schur-concave, when .
So it is natural to ask if statistical measures of variability are Schur-convex. The variance and standard deviation are Schur-convex functions, while the Median absolute deviation is not.
 If  is a convex function defined on a real interval, then  is Schur-convex.
 The Gini coefficient is strictly Schur convex.

References

See also
 Quasiconvex function

Convex analysis
Inequalities